Lozhkin (from ложка meaning spoon) is a Russian masculine surname, its feminine counterpart is Lozhkina. It may refer to
Andrei Lozhkin (born 1984), Russian football player
Andrei Lozhkin (ice hockey) (born 1985), Russian ice hockey player
Boris Lozhkin (born 1971), Ukrainian businessman and politician
Nikita Lozhkin (born 1991), Russian ice hockey goaltender

Russian-language surnames